This discography documents albums and singles released by American vocal group Sister Sledge.

Albums

Studio albums

Compilation albums
Charting compilations

Additional compilations
The Best of Sister Sledge (1973–1985) (1992, Rhino)
The Very Best of Chic & Sister Sledge (1999, WEA Int'l)
The Essentials (2002, Rhino)
Good Times: The Very Best of the Hits & the Remixes (with Chic) (2005, WEA Int'l)
The Definitive Groove Collection (2006, Rhino)
Original Album Series (2011, Rhino)
We Are Family: The Essential (2012, Music Club)
An Introduction to Sister Sledge (2018, Rhino)
Thinking Of You: The Atco/Cotillon/Atlantic Recordings 1973-1985 (2020, Soulmusic)

Singles

References

External links

Discographies of American artists
Pop music group discographies
Rhythm and blues discographies
Disco discographies